The Macquarie University Real Tennis Club (formerly the Sydney Real Tennis Club) played real tennis at Macquarie University in Sydney, Australia.  Its only court closed on 31 December 2005, converted to other athletic uses.  However, the university has agreed to provide land for another court as well as A$350,000 toward its construction.  The club is working to provide additional funds required to begin construction.

The real tennis club is still formally organized, and members may play at other real tennis clubs.  It had been one of only five Australian real tennis clubs with courts, and now joins Real Tennis Perth as a club without a playing venue.

The Sydney Real Tennis Club was reformed in June 2011 with the mission of establishing a new court in Sydney. The Cheltenham Recreation Club has become a confirmed location, that is yet to be built in to a real tennis venue.

External links
 www.sydneyrealtennis.com.au

References
  (MS-Word document)

Defunct real tennis venues
Sports venues in Sydney